Wesley Koolhof and Artem Sitak were the defending champions but chose not to defend their title.

Thomaz Bellucci and Guillermo Durán won the title after defeating Gerard Granollers and Pedro Martínez 2–6, 7–5, [10–5] in the final.

Seeds

Draw

References

External links
 Main draw

JC Ferrero Challenger Open - Doubles